Airbahn Inc (stylized as airbahn) is a planned American airline headquartered in Irvine, California.

History
The airline was founded by Tariq M. Chaudhary (who is also the CEO and chairman of Pakistani airline Airblue). The carrier plans to operate out of Southern California, to destinations in California, Nevada, and Western Canada. Airbahn will receive two A320s from Airblue. The planned service was to start somewhere in the second quarter of 2022, according to Airbahn. 

However, due to Airbahn's slow progress and asked for another extension timeline, the DOT has disagreed and revoked the startup Airbahn's Transport Certificate on May 19, 2022, instead.

Fleet

Destinations

Airbahn plans to operate from Ontario International Airport to three of the following cities along the West Coast of the United States;

References

Further reading

External links 

 

Proposed airlines of the United States
Airlines established in 2018
Airlines based in California